Esther Damalie Nagitta-Musoke (Esther Damalie Naggita-Musoke) is a Ugandan academic, and served as the dean and acting principal of the school of law at Makerere University, in Uganda, for close to five years, from 2012 until 2017. She was preceded by Professor Ben Twinomugisha and succeeded by Dr. Christopher Mbaziira. She is also an Advocate of the Courts of Judicature in Uganda and partner in the Law Chambers of Mubiru-Musoke, Musisi & Co. Advocates.

Education
Naggita-Musoke received her Bachelor of Laws from Makerere University with honours and her Master of Laws from the University of Nottingham. She received her PhD from the University of Wisconsin Law School where she did her dissertation on the legal rights of persons with disabilities in rural Uganda. She also has a Certificate in the Human Rights of Women from the European University Center for Peace Studies in Stadtschlaining, Austria, and a Postgraduate Diploma in Legal Practice from the Law Development Centre in Kampala.

Academic career
In 1993 Nagitta-Musoke joined the School of Law of Makerere University in the Department of Law and Jurisprudence. She teaches and has research interests which include International Humanitarian Law, International Commercial law (especially Finance and Security) and Law of Evidence and Agency. Her writings have mainly been in the area of human rights, specifically women's rights in conflict areas and the plight of the disabled. Naggitta-Musoke has been a visiting professor at the Global Legal Studies Center of the University of Wisconsin–Madison. Since 2012, she has been the dean of the School of Law at Makerere University. She is currently the Law & Jurisprudence member on the editorial committee for the East African Journal of Peace and Human Rights.

See also
 Sylvia Tamale
 Zahara Nampewo

Selected publications

References

External links
 18 MUK Students face expulsion over exam cheating As of 28 February 2017.

Living people
Year of birth missing (living people)
Academic staff of Makerere University
Ugandan women lawyers
Alumni of the University of Nottingham
Makerere University alumni
Law Development Centre alumni
Ugandan academic administrators
Ganda people
Ugandan human rights activists
University of Wisconsin Law School alumni
Ugandan women academics
Women academic administrators